Reeling in the Years is a television series shown on the Irish public broadcaster RTÉ.

Each episode, running for about 25 minutes, reviews the events of a particular selected year, from 1962 to 2019. News archive footage features, along with subtitles as the means of narration, to recount important national and international events of the time. Music from the selected year plays across the footage, with occasional scenes of live performances or music videos, often (but by no means exclusively) by an Irish artist. No advertisements are shown during the broadcast (apart from the occasional old advertisement dating from the relevant year). Each decade takes at least eight months to make.

The theme tune for the series comes from Steely Dan's 1972 song "Reelin' In the Years". The six series are marked by a knowing attitude, where certain stories that seemed inconsequential at the time are remembered because they have taken on significance in the present day. This has gained the programme a reputation for its humour. An example is seen in the 1987 episode: Taoiseach Charles Haughey discusses what he would do if he were to win money in the newly formed National Lottery. Haughey, whose lavish lifestyle was later revealed to have been funded by "donations" from businessmen, exclaims, "I might keep a bit for myself!".

A 2008 poll (conducted by the RTÉ Guide) of Ireland's Top 100 television programmes resulted in Reeling in the Years being voted "most popular home-produced TV programme ever". In 2008, a DVD—Reeling in the 80s—was released for the Irish market—with follow-up DVDs Reeling in the 90s and Reeling in the 70s released in 2009 and 2010, respectively.

Episode list

Original series
The original series focused on the 1980s and first aired on Monday nights from 6 September to 8 November 1999.

Second series
The second series focused on the 1990s and first aired on Monday nights from 11 September to 27 November 2000 except on 30 October and 13 November. New series would be aired biennially rather than annual until 2004 due to Film records pre-1980.

Third series
The third series focused on the 1970s and first aired on Tuesday nights from 10 September to 12 November 2002.

Fourth series
The fourth series focused on the 1960s (1962 to 1969 only) and first aired on Friday nights from 10 September to 29 October 2004. It features neither 1960 nor 1961 as these pre-date the official launch of Telefís Éireann, the television arm of the national broadcaster. It was felt, presumably, that there would be too little archive material from which to make an engaging programme about these years. Indeed, the episodes covering the first half of the 1960s are characterised by extensive use of photographs and posters, as opposed to film and video footage, to represent various historical events. Although the opening night of New Year's Eve 1961 features in at the start of the 1962 programme.

Fifth series
The fifth series focused on the 2000s and first aired on Sunday nights from 17 October to 26 December 2010 except on 28 November due to European Financial Stabilisation Mechanism coverage.

Sixth series
The sixth series focused on the 2010s was produced in 2021, and was broadcast on RTÉ One on Sunday nights from 11 April to 13 June 2021.

Copyright and DVD release

In the past, RTÉ had said that, because of the number of clips from external companies used in the series, it would be infeasible to release it on VHS or DVD. It claimed that securing "video clearance" for each clip and song would make any release prohibitively expensive. RTÉ did consider releasing an altered version of the programme which would only contain the images and music that they owned the rights to, but that "the programme would only be half as good then, it wouldn't be anything like the shows that went out on air, and we'd end up disappointing people."

However, in October 2008, RTÉ announced that they would be releasing a DVD of a cut-down version of the 1980s material. Reeling in the 80s is an altered version of the programme which contains only the images and music that the producers were able to secure rights to, and it runs to about 150 minutes (versus 240 minutes for the original series). It does, however, contain some original material that has been unearthed since 1999, and which has greater significance now, such as footage of former Taoiseach Brian Cowen.

Reeling in the 90s was released on 13 November 2009, while Reeling in the 70s was released in November 2010.

The Reeling in the decades Boxset was released in 2011 which collected the 70s, 80s and 90s DVDs in one boxset.

DVD discography
Reeling in the 80s (2008)
Reeling in the 90s (2009)
Reeling in the 70s (2010)

Legacy
In recent years, Reeling in the Years has been used regularly by RTÉ One as a filler programme during the spring months all the way through to the Christmas period. It currently is shown at 18:30 on Sunday evenings if there is no talent programme or documentary and most bank holidays, when there is no EastEnders it usually fills the 20:00 slot on Mondays or Fridays or even 19:30 slot on Tuesdays or Thursdays. This has led to some interesting parallels with real-life events. When Cian O'Connor won his bronze medal at the 2012 Summer Olympics, RTÉ showed the 2004 episode of Reeling in the Years, complete with Anne Doyle's announcement that O'Connor was to be stripped of his gold medal won at the 2004 Summer Olympics. The next day RTÉ showed the 2005 episode of Reeling in the Years, complete with the announcement that London had secured the 2012 Summer Olympics with then-British Prime Minister Tony Blair reacting by saying what a momentous day it was for neighbouring Britain, followed by footage of the 7 July 2005 London bombings, which occurred the following day.

A website ranked editions of Reeling in the Years in order of the "most and least depressing" – least were 1994, 2004 and 2007; most were 1981, 1986 and 2008.

Similar programmes

Ireland 
The Irish language station TG4 broadcast a similar programme called Siar Sna…. TV3 (now Virgin Media One) aired a programme called series Those Were the Days with a focus on pop music followed by Don't Look Back in Anger in 2018.RTE also broadcast a dates programme in 2000 called 100 Years presented by Brian Farrell.

Other countries
In Britain, the BBC produced a similar series in the early 2000s, called "I Love...", in which public figures discuss the pop culture of each year.

The Spanish version of Reeling in the Years (Los Años del No-Do) began airing in 2013 and is produced by the Spanish state-owned television and radio broadcaster RTVE. The word "No-Do" is a shortened name for Noticiarios y Documentales (News and Documentaries). Following the same format of Reeling in the Years, Los Años del No-Do encompasses the years from 1943 to 1981. It has been associated containing propaganda to support the Spanish caudillo Franco who ruled Spain from 1936 to 1975.

In Norway, the public broadcaster NRK produced a similar series, "Back to the xx-ies" ("Tilbake til xx-tallet") covering the 1960s ("Tilbake til 60-tallet"), 1970s ("Tilbake til 70-tallet"), 1980s ("Tilbake til 80-tallet") and 1990s ("Tilbake til 90-tallet"). They were produced as four series each of 10 episodes covering one year of their respective decade - 40 episodes in total. Different from the "Reeling in the Years" series was that persons prominent in the year covered by an episode also narrated on-screen.

See also
 RTÉ Libraries and Archives, from which much footage is taken
 Timeline of Irish history
 The Rock 'n' Roll Years, the producer's inspiration for Reeling in the Years

References

External links
 Official website
 
 "'It's impossible now to view the decade past without regret'" – interview with series producer John O'Regan. The Irish Times, 9 October 2010.
 Here Come the Good Times: Reeling in the Years as History, Cheap Trick Zine, 18 August 2016.

1999 Irish television series debuts
2000s Irish television series
2010s Irish television series
Irish documentary television series
Irish history television shows
RTÉ original programming
Television series about the history of Ireland
Cultural depictions of Indira Gandhi